Edmoore Takaendesa (born 11 November 1980) is a German international rugby union player, playing for the RG Heidelberg in the Rugby-Bundesliga and the German national rugby union team.

He made his debut for Germany on 19 April 2008 against Ukraine.

Takaendesa originally hails from Zimbabwe, a country he last played for in 2000, after which he moved to Germany. In Zimbabwe, he played for Old Hararians. He was educated at the Prince Edward School there. He is one of a number of Zimbabweans that left their country to play rugby in Germany.

Honours

National team
 European Nations Cup – Division 2
 Champions: 2008

Stats
Edmoore Takaendesa's personal statistics in club and international rugby:

Club

 Updated 30 April 2012

National team

European Nations Cup

Friendlies & other competitions

 Updated 5 March 2010

References

External links
 Edmoore Takaendesa at scrum.com
   Edmoore Takaendesa at totalrugby.de
  Edmoore Takaendesa at the DRV website

1980 births
Living people
Zimbabwean rugby union players
German rugby union players
Germany international rugby union players
RG Heidelberg players
Rugby union fullbacks
Alumni of Prince Edward School
Zimbabwean emigrants to Germany